Anolis macrophallus is a species of lizard in the family Dactyloidae. The species is found in Guatemala and El Salvador.

References

Anoles
Reptiles described in 1917
Reptiles of Guatemala
Reptiles of El Salvador
Taxa named by Franz Werner